Popchikha is a rural locality (a village) in Mikhaylovskoye Rural Settlement, Kharovsky District, Vologda Oblast, Russia. The population was 9 as of 2002.

Geography 
Popchikha is located 11 km east of Kharovsk (the district's administrative centre) by road. Cheremukhovo is the nearest rural locality.

References 

Rural localities in Kharovsky District